Sirsi Baghel is a village in Mirzapur, Uttar Pradesh, India.

Population
In 2011 there were 1,837 people living in Sirsi Baghel.

References

Villages in Mirzapur district